Von Habsburg is a surname. Notable people with the surname include:

Francesca von Habsburg (born 1958), Archduchess of Austria
Gabriela von Habsburg (born 1956), Archduchess of Austria
Géza von Habsburg (born 1940), Archduke of Austria
Karl von Habsburg, (born 1961), Austrian politician, current Head of the House of Habsburg-Lorraine and son of Otto von Habsburg
Otto von Habsburg (1912–2011), Crown Prince of Austria

See also
von Habsburg-Lothringen